Gordon Davidson may refer to:

 Gordon Davidson (director) (1933–2016), American stage and film director
 Gordon Davidson (politician) (1915–2002), Australian politician
 Gordon Davidson (ice hockey) (1918–2004), Canadian ice hockey player
 Gordon B. Davidson (1926–2015), American business attorney and sponsor of Muhammad Ali